National Highway 544E is a national highway in India.  NH 544E is a secondary route of National Highway 44. NH-544E traverses the states of Andhra Pradesh and Karnataka in India.

Route 
Kondikonda checkpost, Lepakshi, Hindupur, [[
]], Rolla, Agali, Sira.

Junctions  

  Terminal near Kondikonda.
  Terminal near Sira.

Construction 
Rehabilitation and up-gradation of 59.1 km of new NH-544E from Kodikonda Junction to Madakasira section to two lane with paved shoulder on EPC mode is being taken up.

See also 

 List of National Highways in India
 List of National Highways in India by state

References

External links 

 NH 544E on OpenStreetMap

National highways in India
National Highways in Andhra Pradesh
National Highways in Karnataka